River Road may refer to:

Places

Communities
 Barbuda-South River Road, Antigua and Barbuda
 River Road, Hamilton, New Zealand
 River Road, North Carolina, US
 River Road, Oregon, US
 River Road, Washington, US

Highways

United States
 County Route 505 (New Jersey), along the Hudson River
 County Route 533 (New Jersey), along the Millstone River
 Farm to Market Road 170, in Texas
 Great River Road, along the Mississippi River
 River Road, Louisiana
 Jefferson Avenue (Detroit), formerly named River Road 
 Louisiana Highway 1064
 Maryland Route 190
 New Jersey Route 29
 Ohio State Route 174
 Pennsylvania Route 32
 River Road National Scenic Byway, in Michigan

Canada
 Manitoba Provincial Road 238
 River Road (Kitchener), Ontario
 River Road (Ottawa), Ontario

Historic districts
 River Road Historic District, in Florida, US
 River Road-Cross Street Historic District, in Massachusetts, US
 East River Road Historic District, in Michigan, US
 River Road Historic Rural District, in New Jersey, US
 River Road Provincial Park in Manitoba, Canada

Other uses
 River Road (band), a 1990s country music group, or its self-titled debut album
 River Road (film), a 2014 Chinese film written and directed by Li Ruijun
 River Road Independent School District, Potter County, Texas
 "River Road", a song by Crystal Gayle, from her album We Must Believe in Magic